Balesht (also Romanized as Baleshat; also known as Bālisht and Palesht) is a village in Horr Rural District, Dinavar District, Sahneh County, Kermanshah Province, Iran. At the 2006 census, its population was 274, in 69 families.

References 

Populated places in Sahneh County